The 1990 Limerick Senior Hurling Championship was the 96th staging of the Limerick Senior Hurling Championship since its establishment by the Limerick County Board.

Ballybrown were the defending champions, however, they were defeated by Patrickswell in first round.

On 21 October 1990, Patrickswell won the championship after a 1-15 to 1-12 defeat of Adare in the final. It was their 12th championship title overall and their first title in two championship seasons.

Results

Final

References

Limerick Senior Hurling Championship
Limerick Senior Hurling Championship